Dense Time is an album released on December 9, 2005 by Icelandic guitar player Guðlaugur Kristinn Óttarsson.

This album contains Guðlaugur's compositions and features some of the most important Icelandic performers, such as Magnús Þór Jónsson (Megas), Björk, Ragnhildur Gísladóttir, among others.

The music ranges from jazz to post-punk and contains references to Bach and ambient music.

Songs
"Zontal" and "Patre" were songs originally recorded when Guðlaugur was playing with singer Björk in a parallel project to their band Kukl known as the Elgar Sisters. Here both songs are performed by Megas. The lyrics of "Patré" were drawn from a poem by Þór Eldon Jónsson plus additional words by Guðlaugur about magic numbers and Platonic polyhedrons. The lyrics for "Zontal" came from a poem by  Þór Eldon titled "Horizontal Position" and additional lyrics by Guðlaugur which were derived from a paper about sub-nuclear structures, Platonic numbers and magic numbers.

"The Seventh Seals" was written by Guðlaugur based on the Book of Revelation towards mid-1983 when the band Þeyr dissolved and this work was arranged to be performed in Kukl. The song changed over the years and on this version, healer Brynjólfur Snorrason reads the New Testament.

"Sirius" contains the text from a work by poet Einar Benediktsson and read by Guðlaugur's stepfather Guðmundur Jónsson, a renowned operatic singer.
"Findings" was composed in 1999 and it is Guðlaugur's tribute to the recent deaths of his father, Óttar Hermann Guðlaugsson (1991) and his sister Vivan Hrefna Óttarsdóttir (1995). Performed by Brynjólfur Snorrason, Hafþór Ólafsson (Súkkat) and Magnús Guðmundsson (former singer of Þeyr), this song tells the story of the gods who return from the battle of Ragnarök as accounted on the Song of the Sibyl from the ancient poetic Edda.

"Stefjahreimur" is a work conceived in 1993 and it features Agnar Wilhelm Agnarsson reading a piece from poet Einar Benediktsson. It was a live improvisation in Studio Hljóðhamar.

"Stígðu Mig" and "Síðasta Ég" were both originally recorded in 1986 when Guðlaugur was playing with Björk in The Elgar Sisters. "Stígðu Mig" was featured on Björk's single Venus as a Boy (CD 2), released in August 1993 and "Síðasta Ég" was featured on Björk's single Big Time Sensuality (CD 1), released in November 1993 and the CD box Family Tree which was released in November 2002.

"Partir" was recorded after "Sirius" in 1999. The lyrics are by Megas who also reads the text. This song was originally called "Plasir d'amore". "Essence" was written to get straight to the core of things, from monotony turning into variegated composition.

Dense Time is closed with "Closure" which was created in January 2005 when Guðlaugur was carrying out some improvisation experiments with three dissonant chords. The vocals were added by Guðlaugur, his daughter Hera Þöll, and Katla Rós Völudóttir. It features an unpublished piece from 1998 written after the death of Tómas Gröndal, a close friend.

Track listing

Personnel
 Producers: Guðlaugur Kristinn Óttarsson, Arnar Guðjónsson and Guðmundur Pétursson.
 Management: Academy of Industry and Arts.
 Album design: GKO & Jón Proppe.
 Booklet: Jón Proppe.
 Publisher: Academy of Industry and Arts.
 Distributor: Smekkleysa.

External links
About Dense Time
Review of Dense Time at the Grapevine

2005 albums
Guðlaugur Kristinn Óttarsson albums